Caldwell is a village and civil parish in the Richmondshire district of North Yorkshire, England, close to the border with County Durham and approximately 10 miles west of Darlington.  According to the 2011 UK census the parish had a population of 138, increasing from 115 at the 2001 census.

History 
Caldwell was mentioned in the Domesday Book in 1096 as being in the hundred of "Land of Count Alan" and the county of Yorkshire, although no population was recorded.

It is recorded in Leland's Itinerary that Caldwell once had a castle. The castle was probably Norman in origin as Leland refers to it as a ruin as early as 1540. It apparently stood very near to the spring in the village, but no other details are known.

Leland had written of the ruined castle at Aldbrough St John and went on to say:

In 1870–72 John Marius Wilson's Imperial Gazetteer of England and Wales described Caldwell as:"a township in St. John-Stanwick parish, N. R. Yorkshire; on an affluent of the river Tees, 8 miles N of Richmond. Acres, 2,000. Real property, £2,102. Pop., 162. Houses, 34."

Governance 
The village lies within the Richmond (Yorks) parliamentary constituency, which is under the control of the Conservative Party. The current Member of Parliament, since the 2015 general election, is Rishi Sunak. Caldwell also lies within the Melsonby ward of Richmondshire District Council.

Community and culture 
The chapel of St. Hilda, built in 1844, was funded by Charlotte Catherine Anne, Countess of Bridgewater, and was formerly part of the Stanwick St John parish. The village has one public house,The Brownlow Arms.

References

External links
 

Villages in North Yorkshire
Civil parishes in North Yorkshire